The discography of Kerry Ellis, a British stage actress and singer, consists of one studio album, one extended play, three cast recordings, and five singles. Her debut album Anthems was released in September 2010.

Albums

Studio albums

Extended plays

Soundtracks

Live albums

Singles

As a featured artist

Videography

Music videos

External links 

 of Kerry Ellis

Ellis, Kerry
Kerry Ellis